Paulo Benedito Bonifácio Maximiano, known simply as Paulinho, (born 30 December 1975) is a Brazilian footballer who played as a  defensive midfielder. He spent most of his career in Brazil with short stints in Qatar and Israel.

Career 
Paulinho began his early career with Botafogo (SP), Patrocinense, Social and Ipatinga.

Between 1999 and 2001 Paulinho played at Villa Nova in Belo Horizonte, Minas Gerais.

In 2001, he joined Gama in the Federal District.

Paulinho also had a short spell at international football, playing for Al-Arabi of Qatar. Returning to Brazil, he rejoined Ipatinga.

During his second stint at Ipatinga, Paulinho's career took off. Became a state champion at Jaipur in 2005 and helped the club to reach the semifinals of the 2006 Copa do Brasil.

His form sparked interest from big clubs and, in 2006, he moved to Flamengo. He became a fan favourite at the club due to his combative style of play.

In 2007, he transferred to Israeli club Maccabi Haifa.

While playing for Volta Redonda in the Campeonato Carioca in 2010, Paulinho tested positive for Benzoylecgonine, a metabolised version of cocaine. He was subsequently banned for two years.

Honours
Minas Gerais State Championship: 2005
Guanabara Cup: 2007
Rio de Janeiro State League: 2007

References

External links
 sambafoot
 Maccabi Haifa FC
 Guardian Stats Centre
 zerozero.pt

1975 births
Living people
Brazilian footballers
Botafogo de Futebol e Regatas players
Ipatinga Futebol Clube players
Vila Nova Futebol Clube players
Sociedade Esportiva do Gama players
Al-Arabi SC (Qatar) players
CR Flamengo footballers
Maccabi Haifa F.C. players
Expatriate footballers in Israel
Qatar Stars League players
Association football midfielders